The List of United States Coast Guard Cutters is a listing of all cutters to have been commissioned by the United States Coast Guard during the history of that service. It is sorted by length down to 65', the minimum length of a USCG cutter.

420' Healy-class Icebreaker (WAGB)

418' Legend-class National Security Cutter, Large (WMSL)

399' Polar-class Heavy Icebreaker (WAGB)

378' High Endurance Cutter (WHEC)

360' Maritime Security Cutter, Medium (WMSM)
 As of July 2022: 5 cutters ordered; 10 more optioned; 25 cutters total in program of record

338' Alamosa-class Cutter (WAK)

327' Treasury-class Cutter (WPG)

311' Casco-class Seaplane Tender (WAVP)

 
 
 
 
 
 
 
 
 
 
 
 
 
 , later

309' Icebreaker (WAGB)

306' Edsall-class Destroyer Escort (WDE)

295' Training Barque Eagle (WIX)

290' Medium Great Lakes Icebreaker (WAGB)

282' Medium Endurance Cutter (WMEC)

270' Medium Endurance Cutter (WMEC)

269' Wind-class Icebreaker (WAGB)

   ex-
 
  ex-
 
 
  ex-
  ex-

255' Owasco-class Cutter (WPG/WHEC)

250' Lake-class Cutter

 ; Later-; 
 ; Later-; 
 ; Later-
 ; Later-; 
 ; Later-
 ; Later-
 ; Later-; ; 
 ; Later-
 ; Later-
 ; Later-

240' Tampa-class Cutter

240' Seagoing Buoy Tender Breaker (WLBB)

230' Medium Endurance Cutter (WMEC)

225' Juniper-class Seagoing Buoy Tenders (WLB)

213' Medium Endurance Cutter (WMEC)
213' Diver-class cutter (WAT)
 
  (ex-Seize)

210' Medium Endurance Cutter (WMEC)

205' Cherokee/Navajo-class Auxiliary Tug (WAT)

204' Seneca-class Revenue Cutter

200' Eagle-class Patrol Craft

192' First Class Cruising Cutter
 USCGC Yamacraw (1909)

190' Miami class

189' Seagoing Buoy Tenders (WLB)

188' First Class Cruising Cutter
 USCGC Seminole

187' Auxiliary Tug (WAT)
  Former USN Lapwing-class minesweeper

180' Seagoing Buoy Tenders (WLB)

Class A (Cactus)

Class B (Mesquite)

Class C (Iris)

180' Oceanographic Vessel (WAGO)

179' patrol coastal (WPC)

s on loan from the United States Navy

178' first class cruising cutter
 USCGC Tuscarora (1902)

176' cargo vessel (WAK)

175' Hollyhock-class buoy tender (WLM)

175' Keeper-class coastal buoy tender (WLM)

173' Magnolia-class bay and sound tender (WAGL)

171' first class cruising cutter
 USCGC Comanche (1915)

166' Tallapoosa class

165' Algonquin-class patrol boat (WPG)

Also known as 165-foot (A) patrol craft

165' Thetis-class patrol boat (WPC)

Also known as 165-foot (B) patrol craft

160' inland construction tender (WLIC)

158' auxiliary tug (WAT)

157' Red-class coastal buoy tender (WLM)

154' Sentinel-class Fast Response Cutter (WPC)

152' seagoing tug
 USCGC Snohomish (1908)

143' auxiliary tug (WATA)
  - Redesignated 
  - Redesignated

140' Bay-class icebreaking tug (WTGB)

133' White-class coastal buoy tender (WAGL/WLM)

125' Active-class patrol boat (WSC)

123' patrol boat (WPB)

113' Sycamore class (WAGL)

110' surface effect ship (WSES)

110' Island-class patrol boat (WPB)

 
 
 
 
 
 
 
 
 
 
 
 
 
 
 
 
 
 
 
 
 
 
 
 
 
 
 
 
 
 
 
 
 
 
 
 
 
 
 
 
 
 
 
 
  (First of the "B" Class)

110' Calumet-class harbor tug (WYTM/WYT)

110' Arundel-class harbor tug (WYTM/WYT)

110' Manitou-class harbor tug (WYTM/WYT)

110' Apalachee-class harbor tug (WYT)

100' inland buoy tender (WLI)

100' inland construction tender (WLIC)

100' Corwin-class patrol boats

95' Cape-class cutter

87' Marine Protector-class coastal patrol boat (WPB)

 
 
 
 
 
 
 
 
 
 
 
 
 
 
 
 
 
 
 
 
 
 
 
 
 
 
 
 
 
 
 
 
 
 
 
 
 
 
 
 
 
 
 
 
 
 
 
 
 
 
 
 
 
 
 
 
 
 
 
 
 
 
 
 
 
 
 
 
 
 
 
 
 USCGC Sea Fox (WPB-87374)

83' patrol craft - 230 hulls, not named

82' Point-class patrol boat (WPB)

 
 
 
 
 
 
 
 
 
 
 
 
 
 
 
 
 
 
 
 
 
 
 
 
 
 
 
 
 
 
 
 
 
 
 
 
 
 
 
 
 
 
 
 
 
 
 
 
 
 
 
 
 
 
 
 
 
 
 
 
 
 
 
 
 
 
   (ex-Point Buchon)
 
 
 
  (ex-Point Houghton)

80' inland buoy tender (WLI)

75' Gasconade-class river buoy tender (WLR)

75' Kankakee-class river buoy tender (WLR)

75' inland construction tender (WLIC)

75' patrol craft "Six-Bitters" - 203 hulls, not named

73' hydrofoil (WPGH)

65' river buoy tender (WLR)

65' inland buoy tender (WLI)

65' small harbor tug (WYTL)

See also
Equipment of the United States Coast Guard
United States Coast Guard Cutter

References

External links
USCG Cutter list
USCG Tenders Since WWII (WAGB, WLB, WLM, WLI, WLR)

Cutters
 
Ships of the United States
Military of the United States